Kharis Ralph (born April 22, 1992) is a Canadian former ice dancer. With Asher Hill, she is the 2008 Canadian national junior champion and 2011 Nebelhorn Trophy bronze medalist.

Personal life 
Kharis Ralph was born in Washington, D.C. but moved to Canada as a child. Her mother is from the Philippines.

Ralph is a student at the University of Toronto, majoring in history.

Career 

Kharis Ralph started skating at age six and began ice dancing a year later. She continued skating in singles for a few years before deciding to focus on ice dancing. She teamed up with Asher Hill in 2002.

Ralph and Hill won the Canadian pre-novice title in 2006 and the Canadian novice title in 2007. In 2007–08, they debuted on the ISU Junior Grand Prix series and became the 2008 Canadian junior champions. They were 8th at the 2008 World Junior Championships. The following season, they won two silver medals on the 2008–2009 ISU Junior Grand Prix circuit and rose to 5th at the World Junior Championships.

Ralph and Hill took another pair of silver medals on the 2009–2010 ISU Junior Grand Prix series and placed 4th on the senior level at the 2010 Canadian Championships. They were assigned to their first senior ISU Championships, the 2010 Four Continents, where they placed 6th.

In 2011–2012, Ralph and Hill won the bronze medal at the 2011 Nebelhorn Trophy. They were fourth at the 2012 Canadian Championships and were assigned to the 2012 World Championships. Ralph and Hill finished 13th at Worlds.

On May 12, 2014, Ralph announced that she had retired from competition.

Programs 
(with Hill)

Competitive highlights 
(with Hill)

References

External links 

 
 Kharis Ralph / Asher Hill at Skate Canada

1992 births
Living people
Canadian female ice dancers
Canadian sportspeople of Filipino descent
Figure skaters from Toronto
Figure skaters from Washington, D.C.
American female ice dancers
Dancers from Washington, D.C.
21st-century American women
21st-century Canadian women